Azerbaijani inventions and discoveries are inventions and discoveries by Azerbaijani scientists and researchers, both locally and while working at overseas research institutes.

Science

Mathematics

Defense 
 Istiglal – a recoil-operated, semi-automatic anti-material sniper rifle.
 Yalguzag – a bolt-action sniper rifle that fires the 7.62×51mm NATO round used by the Azerbaijani Land Forces.

Culture

Art
 Shabaka (window) - stained glass windows made by national Azerbaijani masters, without glue or nails.

Folk music

 Ashiqs of Azerbaijan
 Meykhana - literary and folk rap tradition, consisting of an unaccompanied song performed by one or more people improvising on a particular subject.
 Mugham - folk musical composition from Azerbaijan.

Musical Instruments
 Balaban - a cylindrical-bore, double-reed wind instrument.
 Nagara (drum) folk drum with double head that is played on one side with the bare hands.
 Tar - long-necked, waisted instrument.

Foods 
 Dovga
 Doymenj
 Dushbara a sort of dumplings of dough filled with ground meat and flavor.
 Qutab a thinly rolled dough that may be cooked briefly on a convex griddle.
 Shekerbura Azerbaijani dessert. There are still several of deserts and popular foods of Azerbaijan.

References 

Azerbaijani
Azer

Inventions and discoveries